Dressed to Kill, released in 1946, also known as Prelude to Murder (working title) and Sherlock Holmes and the Secret Code in the United Kingdom, is the last of fourteen films starring  Basil Rathbone as Sherlock Holmes and Nigel Bruce as Doctor Watson.

The film has an original story, but combines elements of the short stories "The Adventure of the Six Napoleons" and "A Scandal in Bohemia."  It is one of four films in the series which are in the public domain.

Plot
John Davidson, a convicted thief in Dartmoor prison (played by an uncredited Cyril Delevanti) embeds code revealing the hidden location of extremely valuable stolen Bank of England currency printing plates in the melody notes of three music boxes that he crafts to be sold at auction. Each box plays a subtly different version of "The Swagman". At the auction each is purchased by a different buyer.

Dr. Watson's friend Julian Emery, a music box collector, pays him and Sherlock Holmes a visit and tells them of an attempted burglary in his house the previous night of a plain cheap box (similar to the one he bought at auction) while leaving other much more valuable ones. Holmes and Watson ask to see and are shown Emery's collection. After they leave, Emery welcomes a female acquaintance, Hilda Courtney, who tries unsuccessfully to buy the auctioned box. When Emery declines, a male friend of Courtney's who has sneaked in murders Emery.

At this murder Holmes becomes even more curious and learns to whom else the boxes were auctioned off. Holmes and Watson arrive at the house of the person who bought the second one, just as a strange maid (Courtney in disguise) is on her way "to go shopping".  They later realize it was not a maid, she locked a child in a closet in order to steal the box from the child.

Holmes is able to buy the third box, and upon examination, discovers that its variant musical notes' numbers correlate to letters of the alphabet. Scotland Yard fills him in on the stolen bank plates to which the music boxes connect, but all three are needed to decipher the message.

Back at home, the flat is found ransacked, and a cigarette with a distinct type of tobacco is the sole clue. Holmes tracks down the woman who bought the tobacco, Courtney.

While confronting her, Holmes is ambushed by her accomplices, handcuffed, taken to a warehouse, hung by a rafter, and left with poison gas filling the room. While Holmes is narrowly escaping death, Courtney steals the box from Watson.

Holmes manages to make it back in one piece and while conversing, Watson offhandedly mentions a quote from Dr. Samuel Johnson. Thinking about this quote, Holmes makes a connection as to where the stolen plates may be hidden.

Having stolen all the boxes and deciphered their message, Courtney and gang join a tour group at Dr. Samuel Johnson's house, now a museum, where they slip away and find the plates hidden within a bookshelf. Courtney is stealing the plates when Holmes ambushes the group. Scotland Yard officers arrest them, and the plates are returned to the bank.

Cast
 Basil Rathbone as Sherlock Holmes
 Nigel Bruce as Dr. John H. Watson
 Patricia Morison as Hilda Courtney/Charwoman
 Edmund Breon as Julian "Stinky" Emery (as Edmond Breon)
 Frederick Worlock as Colonel Cavanaugh (as Frederic Worlock)
 Carl Harbord as Inspector Hopkins
 Patricia Cameron as Evelyn Clifford
 Holmes Herbert as Ebenezer Crabtree
 Harry Cording as Hamid
 Leyland Hodgson as Tour Guide
 Mary Gordon as Mrs. Hudson
 Ian Wolfe as Commissioner of Police of the Metropolis
 Anita Sharp-Bolster as the Schoolteacher on a Museum Tour
 Cyril Delavanti as John Davidson (uncredited)
 Harry Allen as William Kilgour (uncredited)
 Topsy Glyn as The Kilgour Child (uncredited)

References

External links

 
 
 
 
 

1946 films
1946 mystery films
American detective films
American mystery films
American black-and-white films
Sherlock Holmes films
Universal Pictures films
Films directed by Roy William Neill
Articles containing video clips
1940s English-language films
1940s American films